The Johor State Anthem (Jawi: لاݢو بڠسا جوهر), which was composed by Armenian bandmaster Mackertich Galistan Abdullah, had no official lyrics until 1914 when a staff member of the Hong Kong Bank in Johor Bahru, Hubert Allen Courtney, wrote the first English words and Haji Mohamed Said Hj. Sulaiman rewrote it in Malay. It was adapted from the famous Malay tune Dondang Sayang and officially approved and adopted by Sultan Ibrahim in 1897.

Lyrics

References

Notes

External links
National Anthems
Anthem mp3
Lagu Negeri Johor video

Johor
Anthems of Malaysia